Tossing and turning may refer to:

Tossing and turning in bed while attempting to fall asleep; see insomnia
Tossing and turning of vegetables or other food while sautéing
"Tossin' and Turnin'", a 1960 song by Bobby Lewis
"Tossing and Turning" (The Ivy League song), 1965 song by The Ivy League
"Tossing and Turning" (Windjammer song), 1984 song by the american band Windjammer
Tossing and Turning, a 1977 book of poetry by John Updike